Giordano Corsi (9 January 1908 – 29 July 1958) was an Italian professional footballer and manager who played as a defensive midfielder.

He won four scudetto with Bologna. Corna also played six times with the Italy national football team, where he was part of the squad that won the 1933–35 Central European International Cup.

He was manager of Vis Pesaro (1941–1943, 1946–50, 1957–1958).

Honours

Club 
 Bologna
 Serie A: 1935–36, 1936–37, 1938–39, 1940–41
 Mitropa Cup: 1934

International 
Italy
 Central European International Cup: 1933–35

References

External links
 
 

Italian footballers
Italy international footballers
1908 births
1958 deaths
Association football midfielders